Bugs Bunny and the Three Bears is a 1944 Merrie Melodies cartoon short directed by Chuck Jones and written by Tedd Pierce. The short was released on February 26, 1944, and features Bugs Bunny. This short marks the first appearance of Jones' dysfunctional version of The Three Bears, and is a parody of the old fairy tale, Goldilocks and The Three Bears.

Mel Blanc provides the voices of Bugs and Papa Bear (for the latter using a raucous voice similar to Yosemite Sam only a little higher-pitched). Mama Bear is voiced by Bea Benaderet, while Kent Rogers voiced dim-witted Junior. Stan Freberg is often incorrectly credited with voicing the character of Junyer. The cartoon was released four months before Rogers' death in the crash during a training flight in Pensacola, Florida, while he was in the military during World War II.

Plot
The Three Bears are hungry and want something to eat, so they settle on a plan to lure Goldilocks to them with porridge. They find, however, that all they have is carrots, so they make carrot soup instead. The family then pretends to go on a walk through the woods, but quickly comes back to hide in the house and wait for Goldilocks to arrive. The delicious aroma of the carrot soup causes Bugs Bunny to literally float out of his rabbit hole and into the Bears' home. A plot derived from that of the traditional Goldilocks and the Three Bears story unfolds, with Bugs Bunny as the unwitting guest in the home of the three bears.

Bugs Bunny eats the Bears' soup; they prepare to attack him as he does, but fall to the floor pretending to be rugs when Bugs nearly sees them. After eating and then stretching out on the 'rugs' for a bit, Bugs goes for some 'shuteye' in Junior's bed. The Bears recite the Goldilocks story lines and then attack Bugs, but he manages to escape and is seen standing next to Papa Bear's bed, watching the Bears essentially beat up an empty bed. When Mama Bear realizes the situation, she approaches Bugs with her fists raised. He flatters her and tells her that she's beautiful ("Your eyes. Your lips."), and gives her a kiss before he flees. Mama Bear stops Papa Bear and Junior from chasing Bugs, becomes amorous towards the rabbit ("Tell me more about my eyes!"), and attempts to embrace him.

Bugs tries to ward off Mama Bear and get out of the house, opening three doors that reveal Mama Bear in three different seductive poses (in a see-through nightgown, talking on the phone, then in a dress and blonde wig, smoking a cigarette, finally in a bathtub). Bugs crashes through a wall and runs back into his hole. But Mama Bear (unseen) has somehow gotten there first.  With Bugs cornered, she starts giggling like a schoolgirl, wanting to hear him tell her more about her eyes.  She then has her way with Bugs, kissing repeatedly off-screen.  Bugs then emerges from the hole, his face now covered in red lipstick before running off into the horizon screaming.  Mama Bear, who is now shown wearing a thick layer of red lipstick, emerges from the hole, sighing with contentment over her time with Bugs.

Cast
Mel Blanc as Bugs Bunny / Papa Bear
Bea Benaderet as Mama Bear (uncredited)
Kent Rogers as Junior Bear (uncredited)

Home media
VHS - Cartoon Moviestars: Bugs!
Laserdisc - Cartoon Moviestars: Bugs! and Elmer!
VHS - Bugs Bunny Collection: Bugs Bunny's Greatest Hits
Laserdisc - The Golden Age of Looney Tunes: Vol. 3, Side 2: Bugs Bunny
DVD - Looney Tunes Golden Collection: Volume 1, Disc Three
DVD - Looney Tunes: Spotlight Collection, Disc One

Sources

See also
List of American films of 1944

References

External links

 

1944 films
1944 short films
1944 animated films
1940s animated short films
Merrie Melodies short films
Warner Bros. Cartoons animated short films
American parody films
Fairy tale parody films
Short films directed by Chuck Jones
Films based on Goldilocks and the Three Bears
Animated films about rabbits and hares
Animated films about bears
Films scored by Carl Stalling
Films produced by Leon Schlesinger
Bugs Bunny films
1940s Warner Bros. animated short films